Paano Kita Mapasasalamatan? is a Philippine television documentary show broadcast by Kapamilya Channel. Directed by Ryan Agoncillo, it is hosted by Judy Ann Santos. It premiered on June 13, 2020 on the network's Yes Weekend! Saturday evening line up, and worldwide via The Filipino Channel. It aired its season's last episode on June 26, 2021, together with Iba Yan! on Sunday, hosted by Angel Locsin and was replaced by Everybody, Sing! in its timeslot.

Host
 Judy Ann Santos

See also
 List of programs broadcast by A2Z (Philippine TV channel)
 List of programs broadcast by Kapamilya Channel

References

External links
 

ABS-CBN original programming
ABS-CBN News and Current Affairs shows
2020 Philippine television series debuts
2021 Philippine television series endings
Philippine documentary television series
Philippine television docudramas
Filipino-language television shows
Television series by Dreamscape Entertainment Television